Oxacillin (trade name Bactocill) is a narrow-spectrum beta-lactam antibiotic of the penicillin class developed by Beecham.

It was patented in 1960 and approved for medical use in 1962.

Medical uses

Oxacillin is a penicillinase-resistant β-lactam. It is similar to methicillin, and has replaced methicillin in clinical use.  Other related compounds are nafcillin, cloxacillin, dicloxacillin, and flucloxacillin.  Since it is resistant to penicillinase enzymes, such as that produced by Staphylococcus aureus, it is widely used clinically in the US to treat penicillin-resistant Staphylococcus aureus.   However, with the introduction and widespread use of both oxacillin and methicillin, antibiotic-resistant strains called methicillin-resistant and oxacillin-resistant Staphylococcus aureus (MRSA/ORSA) have become increasingly prevalent worldwide.  MRSA/ORSA can be treated with vancomycin or other new antibiotics.

Contraindications
The use of oxacillin is contraindicated in individuals that have experienced a hypersensitivity reaction to any medication in the penicillin family of antibiotics. Cross-allergenicity has been documented in individuals taking oxacillin that experienced a previous hypersensitivity reaction when given cephalosporins and cephamycins.

Adverse effects
 
Commonly reported adverse effects associated with the use of oxacillin include skin rash, diarrhea, nausea, vomiting, hematuria, agranulocytosis, eosinophilia, leukopenia, neutropenia, thrombocytopenia, hepatotoxicity, acute interstitial nephritis, and fever. High doses of oxacillin have been reported to cause renal, hepatic, and nervous system toxicity. Common to all members of the penicillin class of drugs, oxacillin may cause acute or delayed hypersensitivity reactions. As an injection, oxacillin may cause injection site reactions, which may be characterized by redness, swelling, and itching.

Pharmacology

Mechanism of Action
Oxacillin, through its β-lactam ring, covalently binds to penicillin-binding proteins, which are enzymes involved in the synthesis of the bacterial cell wall. This binding interaction interferes with the transpeptidation reaction and inhibits the synthesis of peptidoglycan, a prominent component of the cell wall. By decreasing the integrity of the bacterial cell wall, it is thought that oxacillin and other penicillins kill actively growing bacteria through cell autolysis.

Chemistry
As with other members of the penicillin family, the chemical structure of oxacillin features a 6-aminopenicillanic acid nucleus with a substituent attached to the amino group. The 6-aminopenicillanic acid nucleus consists of a thiazolidine ring attached to a β-lactam ring, which is the active moiety responsible for the antibacterial activity of the penicillin family. The substituent present on oxacillin is thought to impart resistance to degradation via bacterial β-lactamases.

History
Oxacillin, a derivative of methicillin, was first synthesized in the early 1960s as part of a research initiative led by Peter Doyle and John Naylor of Beecham, in consort with Bristol-Myers. Members of the isoxazolyl penicillin family, which includes cloxacillin, dicloxacillin, and oxacillin, were synthesized to counter the increasing prevalence of infections caused by penicillin-resistant Staphylococcus aureus. While methicillin could only be administered via injection, the isoxazolyl penicillins, including oxacillin, could be given orally or by injection. Following the synthesis of cloxacillin and oxacillin, Beecham retained the right to commercially develop cloxacillin in the United Kingdom while Bristol-Myers was given the marketing rights for oxacillin in the United States.

Society and Culture

FDA Approval History
April 8, 1971: Oxacillin Sodium Injectable
Applicant: Sandoz 
July 27, 1973: Bactocill Capsule
Applicant: GlaxoSmithKline
March 10, 1980: Oxacillin Sodium Capsule 
Applicant: Ani Pharms Inc 
May 15, 1980: Oxacillin Sodium for Solution 
Applicant: TEVA 
June 2, 1981: Bactocill for Solution 
Applicant: GlaxoSmithKline 
December 23, 1986: Oxacillin Sodium Powder 
Applicant: Sandoz
September 29, 1988: Oxacillin Sodium Injectable 
Applicant: Watson Labs Inc 
October 26, 1988: Oxacillin Sodium Injectable 
Applicant: Watson Labs Inc 
October 26, 1989: Bactocill in Plastic Container Injectable 
Applicant: Baxter Healthcare 
March 30, 2012: Oxacillin Sodium Injectable 
Applicant: Sagent Pharms
January 18, 2013: Oxacillin Sodium Injectable 
Applicant: Aurobindo Pharma LTD 
August 25, 2014: Oxacillin Sodium Injectable 
Applicant: Mylan Labs LTD 
December 11, 2015: Oxacillin Sodium Injectable 
Applicant: Hospira Inc 
July 31, 2017: Oxacillin Sodium Injectable 
Applicant: Wockhardt Bio/Ag

Pricing
The average wholesale price (AWP) for oxacillin products are provided as follows. The prices listed below are intended to serve as reference values and do not represent the pricing determined by any single manufacturer or entity. 
Bactocill in Dextrose Intravenous
1 g/50 mL: $20.37
2 g/50 mL: $32.48
Oxacillin Sodium Injection 
1 g: $17.52
2 g: $33.99 
10 g: $138.77

References 

 ChemBank

Penicillins
Enantiopure drugs
Isoxazoles